His Captive Woman is a 1929 American part-talking drama film directed by George Fitzmaurice and starring Milton Sills and Dorothy Mackaill. This film is "based on the short story "Changeling" by Donn Byrne in Changeling and Other Stories (New York, 1923)." It was produced and distributed by First National Pictures which was already a subsidiary of the Warner Brothers studios. The Vitaphone sound system was also a subsidiary of Warners. Both Mackaill and Sills as well as director Fitzmaurice had worked together on the previous year's The Barker.

Cast
Milton Sills as Officer Thomas McCarthy
Dorothy Mackaill as Anna Janssen
Gladden James as Alastair De Vries
Jed Prouty as Fatty Fargo
Sidney Bracey as Means
Gertrude Howard as Lavoris Smythe
Marion Byron as Baby Meyers
George Fawcett as Howard Donegan
William Holden as The Court Judge
Frank Reicher as The District Attorney
August Tollaire as The Governor of the Island
Doris Dawson

Preservation
Prints of His Captive Woman are maintained in the Library of Congress and reportedly in the Gosfilmofond Archive.

References

External links

1929 films
First National Pictures films
Films based on short fiction
Films directed by George Fitzmaurice
American drama films
1929 drama films
American black-and-white films
1920s English-language films
1920s American films